Physella wrighti, common name the hotwater physa, is a species of small air-breathing freshwater snail, an aquatic gastropod mollusk in the family Physidae.

Distribution 
This species lives in British Columbia, Canada, found only in the Liard River Hot Springs Provincial Park The Canadian Species at Risk Act listed it in the List of Wildlife Species at Risk as being endangered in Canada.

Habitat
They live on substrates both above and below the water level. They prefer habitats of Chara mats, but can also be found on mats of green alga, woody debris, and stream beds.

References

Physidae
Gastropods described in 1985
Endemic fauna of British Columbia
Endemic fauna of Canada